Makund Bihari Lal  (31 January 1907 – 5 December 2002) was a zoologist and the Seventh Revered Leader of the Radha Soami sect, living at and presiding over Dayalbagh in Agra. He served as a Professor in the Department of Zoology and subsequently as the Vice-Chancellor of University of Lucknow from 1968–71. He was also the founding director of Dayalbagh Educational Institute and the master architect of its education policy.

He was elected as a Fellow of the Indian Academy of Sciences in 1942, and a fellow of the Indian National Science Academy in 1962.

Education 
Mukund Behari Lal studied at the Government High School, Sitapur and the Christian Intermediate College, Lucknow before obtaining a BSc and MSc in zoology from the University of Lucknow. He was awarded Doctor of Science from the University of Edinburgh for his research work and thesis "Trematode Parasites of Birds".

References 

20th-century Indian zoologists
Indian parasitologists
Fellows of the Indian Academy of Sciences
Fellows of the Indian National Science Academy
Radha Soami
1907 births
2002 deaths
Academic staff of the University of Lucknow
University of Lucknow alumni